Alta or ALTA may refer to:

Acronyms
 Alt-A, short for Alternative A-paper, is a type of U.S. mortgage
 American Land Title Association, a national trade association representing the land title industry
 American Literary Translators Association, an association of literary translators in the US
 Amur Leopard and Tiger Alliance or ALTA, an initiative to conserve the Amur leopard and Amur tiger
 Atlanta Lawn Tennis Association
 Australasian Language Technology Association
 Accelerated life testing or Accelerated life testing analysis

Places

Canada 
 Alta Creek, the official name of the River of Golden Dreams, in Whistler, British Columbia
 Alta Lake (British Columbia), a lake in Whistler, British Columbia
 Alta Lake, British Columbia, a community now part of Whistler, British Columbia
 Mont Alta, a hill in the Laurentides zone of the Laurentian Mountains of Quebec, that is the basis of the Ski Mont Alta ski hill; see List of former ski areas of Quebec
Alberta, Canada (abbreviation ALTA)

Norway
 Alta, Norway, a municipality in Finnmark county, Norway
 Alta (town), a town in the municipality of Alta in Finnmark county, Norway
 Alta Airport, an airport in Finnmark county, Norway
 Alta Church, a church in Alta municipality, Finnmark county, Norway
 Alta controversy, a series of protests over Sámi rights and dam on the Altaelva
 Alta IF, Norwegian football club
 Alta Museum
 Altaelva (Alta River), Troms og Finnmark county

Sweden 
 Älta, a locality in Nacka Municipality

Ukraine
 Alta (river), a small tributary of the Trubizh in Ukraine

United States 
 Alta, California, a community in Placer County, California
 Alta California ("Upper California"), the Mexican territory that later became the U.S. state of California
 Alta, Illinois, a community in Peoria County, Illinois
 Alta, Indiana, a community in Vermillion County, Indiana
 Alta, Iowa, a city in Buena Vista County, Iowa
 Alta, Utah, a town in Salt Lake County, Utah
 Alta Ski Area, a ski area located in the Wasatch Mountains, in Salt Lake County, Utah
 Alta, Fayette County, West Virginia, an unincorporated community in Fayette County, West Virginia
 Alta, Greenbrier County, West Virginia, an unincorporated community in Greenbrier County, West Virginia
 Alta, Wyoming, a community in Teton County, Wyoming
 Alta Lake State Park, a park in the northwest interior of the state of Washington

People
 Alta (poet) (Alta Gerrey, born 1942), poet and prose writer from Oakland, California
 Alta Cohen, Major League Baseball player

Art, entertainment, and media
 Alta (novel), a 2004 fantasy novel by Mercedes Lackey
 Alta, Spanish term equivalent to the dance Saltarello
 Acqua Alta, a novel by Donna Leon
 Alta capella, a 20th-century musicological term for Renaissance wind ensembles

Businesses
 Alta (vehicles), a defunct Greek manufacturer of cars, light trucks and motorcycles
 Alta Bike Share, a provider of bicycle sharing systems in the US and Australia
 Alta Car and Engineering Company, an English automobile and a Formula One racing manufacturer
 Alta Group Newspapers, a defunct newspaper publisher in the northeastern US
 Alta Motors, a defunct American manufacturer of electric motorcycles
 Alta Newspaper Group, a newspaper publisher in Western Canada and Quebec
 Alta Records, Dallas, Texas
 Treno Alta Velocità (Italian: High Velocity Train), a special purpose entity formed to plan and construct a high-speed rail network in Italy

Ships
 MV Alta, a ship that was abandoned at sea in 2018 and ran aground in Ireland in 2020
 , a museum ship in Oslo, Norway

Other uses
 Alta (dye), a red paste used by women in Bangladesh and India, to paint the borders of the feet
 Acqua alta (Italian: "high water"), the term used in Veneto for the exceptional tide peaks that occur periodically in the northern Adriatic Sea

See also

 
 
 Altas (disambiguation)
 Altamont (disambiguation)
 AltaVista, search engine
 Alto (disambiguation)
 Arta (disambiguation)

ja:アルタ